Immunoglobulin G (Ig G) is a type of antibody. Representing approximately 75% of serum antibodies in humans, IgG is the most common type of antibody found in blood circulation. IgG molecules are created and released by plasma B cells. Each IgG antibody has two paratopes.

Function 

Antibodies are major components of humoral immunity. IgG is the main type of antibody found in blood and extracellular fluid, allowing it to control infection of body tissues. By binding many kinds of pathogens such as viruses, bacteria, and fungi, IgG protects the body from infection.

It does this through several mechanisms:
 IgG-mediated binding of pathogens causes their immobilization and binding together via agglutination; IgG coating of pathogen surfaces (known as opsonization) allows their recognition and ingestion by phagocytic immune cells leading to the elimination of the pathogen itself;
 IgG activates all the classical pathway of the complement system, a cascade of immune protein production that results in pathogen elimination;
 IgG also binds and neutralizes toxins;
 IgG also plays an important role in antibody-dependent cell-mediated cytotoxicity (ADCC) and intracellular antibody-mediated proteolysis, in which it binds to TRIM21 (the receptor with greatest affinity to IgG in humans) in order to direct marked virions to the proteasome in the cytosol;
 IgG is also associated with type II and type III hypersensitivity reactions.

IgG antibodies are generated following class switching and maturation of the antibody response, thus they participate predominantly in the secondary immune response. 

IgG is secreted as a monomer that is small in size allowing it to easily perfuse tissues.  It is the only antibody isotype that has receptors to facilitate passage through the human placenta, thereby providing protection to the fetus in utero. Along with IgA secreted in the breast milk, residual IgG absorbed through the placenta provides the neonate with humoral immunity before its own immune system develops. Colostrum contains a high percentage of IgG, especially bovine colostrum.  In individuals with prior immunity to a pathogen, IgG appears about 24–48 hours after antigenic stimulation.

Therefore, in the first six months of life, the newborn has the same antibodies as the mother and the child can defend itself against all the pathogens that the mother encountered in her life (even if only through vaccination) until these antibodies are degraded. This repertoire of immunoglobulins is crucial for the newborns who are very sensitive to infections, especially within the respiratory and digestive systems.

IgG are also involved in the regulation of allergic reactions. According to Finkelman, there are two pathways of systemic anaphylaxis: antigens can cause systemic anaphylaxis in mice through classic pathway by cross-linking IgE bound to the mast cell receptor FcεRI, stimulating the release of both histamine and platelet activating factor (PAF). In the alternative pathway antigens form complexes with IgG, which then cross-link macrophage receptor FcγRIII and stimulates only PAF release.

IgG antibodies can prevent IgE mediated anaphylaxis by intercepting a specific antigen before it binds to mast cell–associated IgE. Consequently, IgG antibodies block systemic anaphylaxis induced by small quantities of antigen but can mediate systemic anaphylaxis induced by larger quantities.

Structure 
IgG antibodies are large globular proteins made of four peptide chains; two identical γ (gamma) heavy chains of about 50 kDa and two identical light chains of about 25 kDa. The resulting tetrameric quaternary structure, therefore, has a total molecular weight of about 150 kDa. The two heavy chains are linked to each other and to a light chain each by disulfide bonds. The resulting tetramer has two identical halves, which together form a Y-like shape. Each end of the fork contains an identical antigen binding site. The various regions and domains of a typical IgG are depicted in the figure "Anatomy of an IgG". The Fc regions of IgGs bear a highly conserved N-glycosylation site at asparagine 297 in the constant region of the heavy chain. The N-glycans attached to this site are predominantly core-fucosylated biantennary structures of the complex type. In addition, small amounts of these N-glycans also bear bisecting GlcNAc and α-2,6-linked sialic acid residues. The N-glycan composition in IgG has been linked to several autoimmune, infectious and metabolic diseases.

Subclasses 

There are four IgG subclasses (IgG1, 2, 3, and 4) in humans, named in order of their abundance in serum (IgG1 being the most abundant).

Note: IgG affinity to Fc receptors on phagocytic cells is specific to individual species from which the antibody comes as well as the class. The structure of the hinge regions (region 6 in the diagram) contributes to the unique biological properties of each of the four IgG classes. Even though there is about 95% similarity between their Fc regions, the structure of the hinge regions is relatively different.

Given the opposing properties of the IgG subclasses (fixing and failing to fix complement; binding and failing to bind FcR), and the fact that the immune response to most antigens includes a mix of all four subclasses, it has been difficult to understand how IgG subclasses can work together to provide protective immunity. In 2013, the Temporal Model of human IgE and IgG function was proposed. This model suggests that IgG3 (and IgE) appear early in a response. The IgG3, though of relatively low affinity, allows IgG-mediated defences to join IgM-mediated defences in clearing foreign antigens. Subsequently, higher affinity IgG1 and IgG2 are produced. The relative balance of these subclasses, in any immune complexes that form, helps determine the strength of the inflammatory processes that follow. Finally, if antigen persists, high affinity IgG4 is produced, which dampens down inflammation by helping to curtail FcR-mediated processes.

The relative ability of different IgG subclasses to fix complement may explain why some anti-donor antibody responses do harm a graft after organ transplantation.

In a mouse model of autoantibody mediated anemia using IgG isotype switch variants of an anti erythrocytes autoantibody, it was found that mouse IgG2a was superior to IgG1 in activating complement. Moreover, it was found that the IgG2a isotype was able to interact very efficiently with FcgammaR. As a result, 20 times higher doses of IgG1, in relationship to IgG2a autoantibodies, were required to induce autoantibody mediated pathology. Since mouse IgG1 and human IgG1 are not entirely similar in function, and the inference of human antibody function from mouse studies must be done with great care. However, both human and mouse antibodies have different abilities to fix complement and to bind to Fc receptors.

Role in diagnosis 

The measurement of immunoglobulin G can be a diagnostic tool for certain conditions, such as autoimmune hepatitis, if indicated by certain symptoms. Clinically, measured IgG antibody levels are generally considered to be indicative of an individual's immune status to particular pathogens. A common example of this practice are titers drawn to demonstrate serologic immunity to measles, mumps, and rubella (MMR), hepatitis B virus, and varicella (chickenpox), among others.

Testing of IgG is not indicated for diagnosis of allergy, and there is no evidence that it has any relationship to food intolerances.

See also 
 Epitope
 IgG4-related disease

References

External links 
 Janeway Immunobiology – The structure of a typical antibody (IgG)
 A booklet with everything you wanted to know about IgG subclasses

Glycoproteins
Antibodies